"Homer's Barbershop Quartet" is the first episode of the fifth season of the American animated television series The Simpsons. It originally aired on the Fox network in the United States on September 30, 1993. It features the Be Sharps, a barbershop quartet founded by Homer Simpson. The band's story roughly parallels that of the Beatles. George Harrison and David Crosby guest star as themselves, and the Dapper Dans partly provide the singing voices of the Be Sharps.

The episode was written by Jeff Martin and directed by Mark Kirkland. The episode begins with the Simpson family as they attend a swap meet. There, Bart Simpson and his sister Lisa notice a picture of their father, Homer, on the cover of an old LP album. Homer explains to his family that he, Principal Skinner, Barney Gumble, and Apu Nahasapeemapetilon recorded a barbershop quartet album in 1985, which catapulted them to national fame. He narrates to his family the story of how the band formed, reached the pinnacle of success, and eventually folded. At the end of the episode, the group reunites to perform a concert on the roof of Moe's Tavern, singing their number-one hit "Baby on Board".

Throughout the episode, several references are made to the Beatles and other popular culture icons.

In its original American broadcast, "Homer's Barbershop Quartet" finished 30th in ratings, with a Nielsen rating of 12.7. It was praised for its Beatles cameo, despite being a leftover episode from the previous season. Reviews that criticized the episode's inconsistent humor blamed it on the change of writers before the episode's creation.

Plot
At the Springfield Swap Meet, Bart and Lisa notice Homer on the cover of an LP album. Homer tells the story of how he, Principal Skinner, Barney, and Apu recorded a barbershop quartet album in 1985, which catapulted them to national fame.

In 1985, Homer, Skinner, Apu and Chief Wiggum entertained nightly at various Springfield community gigs, including Moe's Tavern, which was then called Moe's Cavern. An agent named Nigel offered to represent the group, but only on the condition that they replaced Wiggum; Homer did this by abandoning him on the side of the road in the forest. They held auditions for a fourth member, but had no luck until they heard Barney's beautiful Irish tenor voice in the men's room. After their first show as a foursome, they decided to name themselves "The Be Sharps".

In the present, on the drive home from the swap meet, Homer brags that he sold his car's spare tire at the swap meet, when one of the tires blows out. While Marge walks twelve miles to the nearest gas station to get a new tire, Homer continues the story.

Homer had little luck as a songwriter until Marge bought a "baby on board" bumper sticker, inspiring him to write a song by that title. The song "Baby on Board" was the lead single from the group's debut album, Meet the Be-Sharps, and became a hit. The Be Sharps performed at the Statue of Liberty's centennial in 1986, and won a Grammy Award for Outstanding Soul, Spoken Word, or Barbershop Album of the Year. At the ceremony, Barney met his hero David Crosby and Homer met George Harrison of the Beatles. That night, Homer called home to talk to Lisa and Marge and became disillusioned upon realizing how much they missed him.

Back home from the swap meet, Homer goes through the Be-Sharps' merchandise, including lunch boxes, mugs, and posters, as well as their second album, Bigger than Jesus. Bart wonders how it all went wrong, and Homer tells the end of the story.

While the Be Sharps grew in fame, Marge had trouble raising the kids alone, building a replica of Homer using a tape recorder and several household items. Creative disputes arose within the group when Barney began dating a Japanese conceptual artist who monopolized his time and drove them away from their barbershop roots. Eventually, an issue of Us magazine's "What's Hot and What's Not" noted that the band was "not"; the Be Sharps split up. Skinner returned to Springfield Elementary School, Apu returned to his "honest work" at the Kwik-E-Mart, Barney took his girlfriend to Moe's, and Homer returned to the Springfield Nuclear Power Plant, where his position had temporarily been covered by a chicken.

The kids wonder why this is the first time they are hearing the story of Homer's brief time as a best-selling artist, but Homer puts them to bed, offering to answer their questions another time. Looking fondly at their album cover, Homer calls Skinner, Apu and Barney to arrange a reunion. The next day, the reunited group perform "Baby on Board" on the roof of Moe's. Pedestrians stop and listen to their comeback concert, including Harrison, who dismissively remarks, "It's been done", and Wiggum prepares to take revenge on his former bandmates by releasing tear gas into the crowd.

Production

One of the writers for The Simpsons suggested that they should create an episode that focuses on Homer in a barbershop quartet and "a big parody of the Beatles." The episode was written by Jeff Martin, who was an "obsessive" Beatles fan, making him "a natural to write [the episode]." Mark Kirkland, a "huge" Beatles fan, directed the episode, and ensured that the Beatles references were accurate. Kirkland enjoyed directing the episode because unlike other episodes he directed, he did not experience any trouble animating "Homer's Barbershop Quartet". The animators liked creating the Beatles gags and enjoyed the barbershop music. After the animators synchronized the audio track, music, and animation, they "just fell in love" with it. They also enjoyed working on the choreography of the Be Sharps and trying to match the characters' movements with the music. They were inspired by the Beatles film Let It Be, including the shots of the band in the recording studio where they decide to break up. Kirkland did not think there was anything "spectacular" in the episode's animation, but he and his animation team "just loved" working on it.

In a scene in the episode, Lisa sees a man selling an original Malibu Stacy doll from 1958 that has big, pointed breasts. The man, nicknamed "Wiseguy" by the show's staff, tells Lisa that "they took [the doll] off the market after some kid put both his eyes out." The joke received a censor note from the Fox network's censors because they did not want such jokes on the show, but the producers ignored the note and the joke appeared in the episode when it aired.

The Be Sharps' singing voices were partly provided by the four members of The Dapper Dans, a barbershop quartet that performs at Disneyland in Anaheim, California. Before working on the episode, Martin had seen one of the quartet's performances and enjoyed it. When the episode's production began, he contacted the quartet, and they agreed to make a guest appearance in the episode. The Dapper Dans' singing was intermixed with the normal voice actors' voices, often with a regular voice actor singing the melody and The Dapper Dans providing backup.

George Harrison guest stars in the episode as himself. He was the second Beatles member after Ringo Starr (in "Brush with Greatness") to appear on The Simpsons. When Harrison arrived at the recording studio in West Los Angeles to record his lines, the casting director told the episode's show runners, Al Jean and Mike Reiss, that Harrison was coming and that they were not allowed to tell anybody about it because it was intended to be a secret to the staff. Jean, Reiss, and the show's creator Matt Groening went to see Harrison in the studio, and when they returned to the writer's room, Groening, unaware that it was supposed to be a secret, said, "Guess who I just met! George Harrison!" Harrison arrived at the studio by himself, without any entourage or bodyguards. Groening recalls that Harrison was "pretty glum," and he was unenthusiastic when the staff asked him questions about the Beatles. However, when Groening asked Harrison about the Wonderwall Music album, he suddenly "perked up" because it was one of his solo albums that he was rarely questioned on. Harrison's guest appearance was one of Groening's favorites because he was "super nice" and "very sweet" to the staff. Jean said it was a "huge thrill" to have him appear. David Crosby also makes a guest appearance in the episode as himself, and appears in the scene in which he presents a Grammy Award to the Be Sharps.

"Homer's Barbershop Quartet" was a hold-over episode from the season four production line. It was chosen to air as the fifth season's premiere episode because it guest starred Harrison. The Fox network executives wanted to premiere with Conan O'Brien's episode "Homer Goes to College" because of its parody of the 1978 comedy film National Lampoon's Animal House, but the writers felt "Homer's Barbershop Quartet" would be a better choice because of Harrison's involvement. The episode originally aired on the Fox network in the United States on September 30, 1993. It was included in a 2002 video collection of selected musical-themed episodes titled The Simpsons: Backstage Pass. The episode was also included in The Simpsons season five DVD set, which was released on December 21, 2004.

Cultural references
The episode makes numerous references to the Beatles. Their first album, Meet the Be Sharps, is a parody of the Meet the Beatles! album. Moe's Tavern changes its name to Moe's Cavern, a reference to the Cavern Club in Liverpool where the Beatles frequently performed in the early 1960s. Chief Wiggum, thrown out of the band because he was "too Village People," mirrors Pete Best,  an early member of the Beatles who was replaced by Ringo Starr. Like Ringo Starr, Apu is given a stage name: Apu de Beaumarchais.

The cover of Bigger Than Jesus, the Be Sharps' second album, features the group walking on water, and is a visual parody of the art on the Beatles' album Abbey Road. The name is a reference to a controversial quote made by John Lennon in 1966. Bart references this by asking, "What did you do [to lose your popularity]? Screw up like the Beatles and say you were bigger than Jesus?" Homer replies, "All the time. That was the title of our second album." At the end of the episode, the album's back cover is revealed, on which Homer is seen turned away from the camera, as opposed to the rest of the band. This is a parody of the Sgt. Pepper's Lonely Hearts Club Band LP reverse, in which Paul McCartney is in the same position. Barney's Japanese conceptual artist girlfriend is a parody of Yoko Ono. Their song repeats the phrase "Number 8" and a burp by Barney, a reference to the Beatles' "Revolution 9". While Barney plays this song to the group, the members are seen standing in such a way to resemble a photograph of The Beatles in their studio with Yoko Ono. The group performing atop Moe's Tavern at the end of the episode is a parody of the Beatles' impromptu concert on the Apple Corps rooftop during their Get Back recording sessions in 1969, hence George Harrison's line, "It's been done." In addition, the Be Sharps are wearing the same outfits as the Beatles during the rooftop concert scene: Barney in a brown fur coat (John), Homer in a bright red coat (Ringo), Skinner in a black suit (Paul), and Apu in a black Mongolian lamb coat with green trousers (George). After the performance, Homer says, "I'd like to thank you on behalf of the group and I hope we passed the audition," paraphrasing a quote by John Lennon at the end of the Beatles rooftop performance.

At the swap meet, Mayor Quimby says "Ich bin ein Springfield Swap Meet Patron," a parody of John F. Kennedy's famous Cold War quote. Homer browses through a box with items that cost five cents each. These include the United States Declaration of Independence, a copy of Action Comics #1, a complete block of Inverted Jenny misprint postal stamps, and a Stradivarius violin. Principal Skinner tries on his former Vietnam prison mask with the number 24601, notable as Jean Valjean's prison number in Les Misérables. Homer buys Grampa a pink Cadillac, just as Elvis Presley did for his mother. One of the late night television shows Chief Wiggum watches is Johnny Carson doing his Carnac the Magnificent routine. Homer mentions that 1985 was the year that Joe Piscopo left the NBC sketch show Saturday Night Live. Moe sells oyster shells at the swap meet that resemble Lucille Ball. Homer begins telling the story of the Be Sharps by saying, "Rock and roll had become stagnant. 'Achy Breaky Heart' was seven years away; something had to fill the void. That something was barbershop." Homer references Al Capone's Vault by Geraldo Rivera while writing a new song for the group. The Be Sharps beat the Dexys Midnight Runners at the Grammys and remarks, "you haven't heard the last of them." At the Grammy ceremony, Spinal Tap, Aerosmith, Michael Jackson (Leon Kompowsky) and George Harrison are all at the post awards reception and MC Hammer in the audience. While Bart and Lisa browse through LP albums at the swap meet, they find a recording of "Yankee Doodle" by Melvin and the Squirrels, a band that spoofs Alvin and the Chipmunks. When the Be Sharps perform Goodbye, My Coney Island Baby next to the Statue of Liberty President Ronald Reagan and his wife Nancy Reagan attend the ceremony.

Reception

Critical reception
DVD Verdict gave the episode a Grade A score. DVD Movie Guide's Colin Jacobson felt that the episode "kicks off [the season] with a terrific bang." He appreciated the episode's parodies of a mix of subjects, and its ability to bring them together into a coherent story. Noting that the episode focused on spoofing Beatlemania, Jacobson praised George Harrison's cameo as "probably the best" Beatles cameo in the series.

Giving the episode a score of 5 out of 5, DVD Talk praised the "four-part harmony of hilarity [that] gets a flawless mop top modeling," complimenting the references to pop culture icons as being "right on the money."

TV DVD Reviews commented on how the episode "hit all the right notes," and were pleased with Harrison's cameo.

Despite the episode being a "leftover from last season," The Washington Post still applauded the episode's humor, saying, "Who cares? It's funny."

The Courier-Mail found "Homer's Barbershop Quartet" an entertaining episode.

Asserting that the series hit its peak with season five episodes such as "Homer's Barbershop Quartet", the Sunday Tasmanian called the episode a "first-class offering."

Although it appreciated the story and use of the main characters, Current Film was not enthused about the episode, claiming that it was not consistently funny.

The Age called "Homer's Barbershop Quartet" an awful episode, with a "weak, unfunny parody of The Beatles," blaming the series' change of writers before the episode was written.

IGN ranked the Beatles' appearances on The Simpsons series—in episodes such as "Lisa the Vegetarian", "Brush with Greatness", and "Homer's Barbershop Quartet"—10th on their list of the Top 25 Simpsons Guest Appearances, and the Toronto Star ranked the band fifth on a list of the 11 best cameos on The Simpsons. Andrew Martin of Prefix Mag named Harrison his fourth-favorite musical guest on The Simpsons out of a list of ten.

Ratings
In its original American broadcast, "Homer's Barbershop Quartet" finished 30th in the ratings for the week of September 27 to October 3, 1993, with a Nielsen rating of 12.7, translating to 11,963,400 households.

Legacy
The cocktail Barney's girlfriend orders in this episode – "a single plum, floating in perfume, served in a man's hat" – was recreated by Icelandic artist Ragnar Kjartansson as part of the 2016 exhibit One More Story at the Reykjavík Art Museum, which was curated by Yoko Ono.

References

External links

 

The Simpsons (season 5) episodes
1993 American television episodes
Barbershop music
George Harrison
Cultural depictions of the Beatles
David Crosby
Cultural depictions of Ronald Reagan
Fiction set in 1985
Fiction set in 1986
Television episodes set in the 1980s

it:Episodi de I Simpson (quinta stagione)#Il quartetto vocale di Homer